Against a Dark Background is a science fiction novel by Scottish writer Iain M. Banks, first published in 1993. It was his first science fiction novel not to feature, or be set in, the Culture.

Plot summary
The main protagonist is Lady Sharrow, a former military pilot and antiquities thief. She lives on Golter, a planet orbiting a star in an isolated planetary system with no nearby galaxies. A cult named the Huhsz is granted permission to assassinate her, believing that their messiah can not be born until the end of her family's female bloodline. She is forced to choose between going into hiding for a year or recovering the last Lazy Gun, an ancient weapon of mass destruction that was stolen from the cult by her ancestor.

Sharrow resolves to recover the Lazy Gun, rejecting an offer of help from her cousin Geis, a wealthy industrialist and businessman. In order to do this, she must first find the Universal Principles, a long lost book rumoured to contain a clue to the Gun's hiding place.  She visits her half-sister Breyghun who is held prisoner in the Seahouse, a monastery run by the Sad Brothers. Breyghun tells her that their grandfather Gorko, a collector of rare artefacts, encoded information regarding the location of the Universal Principles into the DNA of his servants. Sharrow recruits the surviving members of her combat unit and sets out to make contact with the son of Gorko's butler. During these events, Sharrow is menaced by two unidentified bald-headed clones, who have the ability to inflict pain on her via a military virus embedded in her nervous system. They demand the Gun be turned over to them and not the Huhsz.

Sharrow and her team follow the trail left by Gorko and recover the Universal Principles. The book has long since turned to dust, but the case contains a quotation that is also inscribed on Gorko's tomb. Sharrow visits the storage facility where the tomb is kept and finds a device that provides them with co-ordinates deep in an embargoed zone. The team are joined by an android named Feril and set out to retrieve the Lazy Gun. After disembarking from the submarine they hired, they are attacked first by air and ground troops. During these encounters, her team are killed one by one and Sharrow is wounded. Sharrow and Feril reach a small tower which contains both the Gun and numerous other pieces of ancient technology. After leaving the tower, Sharrow is immobilised by a neural weapon and the clones appear, confiscate the Gun and take them both prisoner.

They are conveyed to a desert stronghold and are presented to a man named Molgarin, who claims to be immortal. The fortress is attacked, by both the Huhsz and another unidentified set of troops. In the chaos, Sharrow kills the clones and escapes using a monowheeled tank that was found along with the Lazy Gun. She realizes that the first force contained members of the Sad Brothers and she and Feril head for the Seahouse, taking the Lazy Gun with them. They arrive and discover that her cousin Geis has been behind events, acting out of an unrequited love for Sharrow and a desire to engineer political change within the system. Molgarin was an actor employed to try and make Sharrow feel gratitude towards Geis. After they are taken captive Sharrow and Feril cause the Lazy Gun to begin firing uncontrollably and the Seahouse is destroyed, with Feril still inside it. In the confusion, Sharrow kills first her half-sister Breyghun and then Geis, before leaving in the tank, self-identifying with the Lazy Gun and the destruction that it brings to everything it encounters.

History
Against a Dark Background was rewritten from an original work of 1975. Banks said that it was the last of his old material that he had to rewrite.

Banks wrote an epilogue to the book that did not appear with the published text, but is available separately online.

Bibliography
Against a Dark Background, Iain M. Banks, London: Orbit, 1993,  (UK)  (US)

References

External links
Steven Wu's review
Links to reviews of Banks' works, including Against a Dark Background

1993 British novels
1993 science fiction novels
Fiction about terrestrial planets
Novels by Iain M. Banks
Novels set on fictional planets
Orbit Books books
Scottish novels